The Harbansupura Interchange is an interchange constructed in Harbanspura Canal Crossing, Lahore. The Ring Road is elevated by a flyover to allow free movement of traffic. It is a 3 lane dual carriage way with an auxiliary lane on either side, 3 meter outer shoulder and 1.275 meter inner shoulder. The project was started on March 1, 2009 and completed January 30th, 2010. After a total cost of 1200 million PKR, it was integrated with Ring Road Lahore on April 21, 2010.

Construction details

See also 

 Abdullah Gul Interchange
 Saggian Interchange, Lahore

References

External links 
 http://wn.com/Lahore_Ring_Road_Project World News
 http://pakistaniat.com/2010/02/04/lahore-ring-road-project-help-us-build-this-post/?cp=8#comments

Bridges in Pakistan
Road interchanges in Pakistan
Streets in Lahore